Per Daniel Holm (11 September 1835, Smedjebacken - 7 August 1903, Stockholm) was a Swedish landscape painter.

Biography

From 1858 to 1863, he studied landscape painting at the Royal Swedish Academy of Fine Arts, with Nils Andersson, and made numerous study trips to northern Sweden and Norway. In 1862. he was awarded a royal medal for landscapes of Lapland.

He continued his studies in Düsseldorf, Munich, Karlsruhe and Paris. He was named a member of the Royal Academy in 1871, becoming a Vice-Professor of landscape painting in 1873, and a full Professor in 1881. That same year, he became a conservator at the Nationalmuseum. He resigned all of his positions in 1900.  

He was especially appreciated for his depictions of geological formations. He had a large collection of art and old books that was scattered after his death.

References

External links 

 Biography @ the Svenskt biografiskt lexikon
 More works by Holm @ ArtNet

1835 births
1903 deaths
Swedish painters
Swedish landscape painters
Swedish art directors
People from Smedjebacken Municipality